Tupakovo (Tupaq) is a rural locality (a village) in Tashtimerovsky Selsoviet, Abzelilovsky District, Bashkortostan, Russia. The population was 718 as of 2010. There are 7 streets.

Geography 
Tupakovo is located 23 km northeast of Askarovo (the district's administrative centre) by road. Abzelilovo is the nearest rural locality.

References 

Rural localities in Abzelilovsky District